MP6, MP 6, or mP6 may refer to:

 mP6, a microprocessor
 MP 6, a zone during the Oligocene
 Mario Party 6, a 2004 Nintendo GameCube video game and the third game for the console